Didier Lupi Second (c.1520-after 1559) was a French composer, likely of Italian origin, based in Lyons. In 1548 he published Chansons Spirituelles with the poet Guéroult, the first such important publication of its kind by a Protestant. It includes Susanne un jour, a composition which was arranged by many later composers. He also published collections of psalms, secular chansons and other works.

Works
Selected works include:
Dame qui au plaisant son
O que je vis un estrange martyre
Susanne un jour d'amour sollicitée

References

Year of birth unknown
Year of death unknown
Renaissance composers
French classical composers
French male classical composers
Year of birth uncertain